The Liberal Party of Corrientes is a liberal provincial political party in Corrientes Province, Argentina. Founded in 1856, it is the oldest political party in Argentina still active.

The Party had its origins in the Federalist traditions of Corrientes and was founded on 15 December 1856 by Juan Eusebio Torrent. From its first activities it supported Bartolomé Mitre at the national level. José Pampín was elected Corrientes Governor in 1861, the first of 17 Liberal governors. Torrent was Mitre's vice-presidential candidate in 1874.

The party's leading past figures include Juan Balestra, a government minister under Carlos Pellegrini, Raimundo Meabe who governed Salta and Buenos Aires provinces, and Juan R. Aguirre Lanari, a senator and government minister.

The Party was a member of the national Recrear electoral alliance then led by Ricardo López Murphy, having backed López Murphy for president in 2003.

References

Liberal conservative parties in Argentina
Provincial political parties in Argentina
Corrientes Province
Political parties established in 1856
1856 establishments in Argentina